4th Brigade Combat Team or 4 BCT is a modularized brigade of the United States Army. Each division of the United States Army fields 4th Brigade Combat Teams numbered from 1–4.

4th Brigade Combat Team, 1st Armored Division
4th Brigade Combat Team, 1st Cavalry Division
4th Infantry Brigade Combat Team, 1st Infantry Division (United States)
4th Brigade Combat Team, 2nd Infantry Division
4th Brigade Combat Team, 3rd Infantry Division (United States)
4th Brigade Combat Team, 4th Infantry Division (United States)
4th Brigade Combat Team, 10th Mountain Division
4th Brigade Combat Team (Airborne), 25th Infantry Division
4th Brigade Combat Team, 82nd Airborne Division
4th Brigade Combat Team, 101st Airborne Division

See also
 4th Division (disambiguation)
 4th Brigade (disambiguation)
 4th Regiment (disambiguation)
 4th Squadron (disambiguation)